The Plumb BGP-1 is a British single-seat homebuilt biplane developed by Barry Plumb.

Design and development 
The aircraft is patterned after the Pitts Special and is made predominantly from wood. The first example of Plumb's biplane was built between 1975 and 1986 and is on a Popular Flying Association (now Light Aircraft Association) permit to fly.

The aircraft was originally powered by a Volkswagen 1834 engine but now uses a Jabiru 2200A model

A second example, was finished in 2015 and uses a Volkswagen 1834 engine.

Specifications (prototype)

See also 
Similar aircraft
 EAA Biplane
 Currie Wot
 Tipsy Nipper

References 

1980s British sport aircraft
Homebuilt aircraft
Single-engined tractor aircraft
Biplanes
Aircraft first flown in 1986